The 1912 Paris–Tours was the ninth edition of the Paris–Tours cycle race and was held on 24 March 1912. The race started in Paris and finished in Tours. The race was won by Louis Heusghem.

General classification

References

1912 in French sport
1912
March 1912 sports events